Merle A. Alexander (September 2, 1907 – February 2, 1987) was an American professional basketball player. He played for the Indianapolis Kautskys in the National Basketball League during the 1938–39 season. Prior to that, Alexander had played on various teams in the Amateur Athletic Union (AAU), which at the time was considered the premier amateur league for basketball. He was named an AAU All-American in the 1930–31 season while playing for the Wichita Henrys.

References

1907 births
1987 deaths
Amateur Athletic Union men's basketball players
American men's basketball players
Basketball players from Indiana
Centers (basketball)
Forwards (basketball)
Franklin Grizzlies men's basketball players
Indianapolis Kautskys players
People from Rushville, Indiana